Qiziltepa (sometimes spelled Kyzyltepa; , Қизилтепа, قىزىلتېپه) is a town and seat of Qiziltepa District in Navoiy Region in Uzbekistan. The population was 9884 people in 1989, and 12,200 in 2016. The name translates to “Red hill”.

References

Populated places in Navoiy Region
Cities in Uzbekistan